The TFF Third League or TFF 3. Lig is the fourth level in the Turkish football league system. The top two clubs from Ranking Groups qualify to the Promotion Group of Stage 2. Promotion Group clubs start the second stage without any carryovers.Top four clubs from the Promotion Group will be promoted to TFF 2. Lig of 2009–2010 season.Top clubs from the Classifying Groups and the 5th, 6th and 7th clubs from Promotion Group qualify for the Play-off matches to determine the last two teams to be promoted to TFF 2. Lig.

The tables and the results of the teams playing in TFF 3. Lig Promotion Group in 2008–09 season are as follows:

Teams

Standings

Results

Top scorers 
 Last updated on May 24, 2009

Stadiums

References 

Pro